Sabrina Schulz (born 1 June 1994) is an Austrian figure skater. She qualified to the free skate at two ISU Championships – the 2012 World Junior Championships in Minsk, Belarus, and 2013 World Junior Championships in Milan, Italy.

Programs

Competitive highlights 
CS: Challenger Series; JGP: Junior Grand Prix

References

External links 

 

1994 births
Austrian female single skaters
Living people
Sportspeople from Munich